TV5 Mongolia, or TV5, is a television broadcasting station in Mongolia.

The station works closely with the Mongolian National Broadcaster and is financed by advertising, sponsoring, and government subsidies. The program is also available in streaming format online for a fee. This access method is primarily used by Mongolians living abroad.

See also
Media of Mongolia
Communications in Mongolia

External links
Official Site 

Television companies of Mongolia
Television channels and stations established in 1997